Edwin Albert Brinkman (December 8, 1941 – September 30, 2008) was an American professional baseball player, coach and scout. He played for 15 seasons in Major League Baseball, principally as a shortstop,  for the Washington Senators (1961–1970), Detroit Tigers (1971–1974), St. Louis Cardinals (1975), Texas Rangers (1975), and New York Yankees (1975). Brinkman led the American League in games played twice, won a Gold Glove Award at shortstop, and had a career batting average of .224. He was named to the American League All-Star team in 1973.

Early life
Brinkman was born and raised in Cincinnati, Ohio. He attended Western Hills High School, where he played alongside Pete Rose on the school's baseball team. Paul "Pappy" Nohr, the baseball coach at Western Hills, described Rose as "a good ball player, not a Brinkman." Based on their performance in high school, scouts saw Brinkman rather than Rose as the future superstar. When he was a senior, Brinkman batted .460 and also won 15 games as a pitcher including a perfect game.

Brinkman was paid a large (for the time) bonus of $75,000 by the Washington Senators in 1961. Brinkman later said: "Pete always kidded me that the Washington Senators brought me my bonus in an armored truck. Pete said he had cashed his at the corner store."

Major league playing career
Brinkman began the 1961 season playing for the Senators' minor league teams in Middlesboro and Pensacola before making his major league debut with the Senators on September 6, 1961, at age 19. Although Brinkman was known as a good defensive player, he seldom provided much of an offensive contribution for a Senators team that routinely finished near the bottom of the final standings. His best batting average in the first eight years of his career was a .229 average posted in 1966 when he led American League shortstops with a 3.3 defensive Wins Above Replacement (WAR). In 1969, Ted Williams was named as the Senators' manager and, he worked to improve Brinkman's hitting skills. Brinkman responded with a career-high .266 batting average as well as 71 runs scored, also a career-high. Brinkman once again led the league's shortstops with a 3.3 defensive WAR rating in 1969. He continued to improve in 1970 with a career-high 162 hits in 152 games. He also led the league's shortstops in assists and in putouts.

In 1971, Brinkman was part of an eight-player trade which sent himself, third baseman Aurelio Rodríguez and pitchers Joe Coleman and Jim Hannan from the Senators to the Detroit Tigers in exchange for Denny McLain, Don Wert, Elliott Maddox, and Norm McRae. He had his best season defensively in 1972. Playing in all of the Tigers' 156 games, he set American League fielding records for shortstops with the most consecutive games without an error (72), most consecutive chances without an error (331), fewest errors in 150 games or more (7) and the highest fielding percentage in 150 games or more (.990). He also produced a career-high 49 runs batted in, helping the Tigers clinch the American League Eastern Division championship by a half game over the Boston Red Sox. Brinkman only appeared in one game of the 1972 American League Championship Series before he was ruled out for the rest of the season due to a ruptured disc in his lower back. The Tigers lost the championship series to the eventual world champions, the Oakland Athletics, in five games. Brinkman's efforts during the regular season earned him the 1972 Gold Glove Award and he was named the recipient of the "Tiger of the Year" award by the Detroit baseball writers. He also finished ninth in voting for the 1972 American League Most Valuable Player Award. Brinkman earned his first and only All-Star Game appearance when he was named as an American League reserve in the 1973 All-Star Game. He hit a career-high 14 home runs in the 1974 season. 

He was involved in a three-team deal on November 18, 1974 in which he was first traded along with Bob Strampe and Dick Sharon from the Tigers to the San Diego Padres for Nate Colbert and then sent to the St. Louis Cardinals for Sonny Siebert, Alan Foster and Rich Folkers. Danny Breeden went from the Padres to the Cardinals to subsequently complete the transactions. Brinkman appeared in 24 games with the Cardinals before being traded along with Tommy Moore to the Texas Rangers for Willie Davis on June 4, 1975. After only one appearance with the Rangers, his contract was purchased by the New York Yankees on June 13, 1975. He played in 44 games for the Yankees before they gave him his unconditional release on March 29, 1976 as, he continued to be hampered by his back injury. Brinkman played his final major league game on September 28, 1975 at the age of 33.

Career statistics
In a fifteen-year major league career, Brinkman played in 1,845 games, accumulating 1,355 hits in 6,045 at bats for a .224 career batting average along with 60 home runs, 461 runs batted in and an on-base percentage of .280. Defensively, he recorded a .970 fielding percentage as a shortstop. Brinkman holds the American League record for the fewest hits in a season while playing a minimum of 150 games, with 82 hits in 1965.

Coaching career
After his playing career he was hired by the Tigers as a minor league roving fielding instructor in 1976.  Brinkman then became a minor league manager in the Detroit organization, leading the 1977 Montgomery Rebels to a first-place finish in the Southern League. He spent  on the Tigers' MLB coaching staff. Later, he was a coach and scout with the Chicago White Sox for 18 years (1983–2000), initially as the ChiSox' MLB infield coach (1983–1988) and then special assignment scout. He retired after the 2000 season.

Ed Brinkman died on September 30, 2008 at the age of 66, due to complications from heart failure. His younger brother, Chuck Brinkman also played in Major League Baseball as a catcher.

Notes
 William A. Cook, "Pete Rose: Baseball All-Time Hit King"
 David M. Jordan, "Pete Rose: A Biography" (Greenwood Press 2004)

References

External links

1941 births
2008 deaths
American League All-Stars
Baseball coaches from Ohio
Baseball players from Cincinnati
Birmingham Barons managers
Burials at Spring Grove Cemetery
Chicago White Sox coaches
Chicago White Sox scouts
Cincinnati Bearcats baseball players
Deaths from lung cancer in Ohio
Detroit Tigers coaches
Detroit Tigers players
Gold Glove Award winners
Lakeland Flying Tigers managers
Major League Baseball shortstops
Major League Baseball third base coaches
Middlesboro Senators players
New York Yankees players
Pensacola Senators players
Raleigh Capitals players
St. Louis Cardinals players
San Diego Padres coaches
Texas Rangers players
Washington Senators (1961–1971) players